Velneperit (S-2367) is a drug developed by Shionogi, which acts as a potent and selective antagonist for the Neuropeptide Y receptor Y5. It has anorectic effects and was developed as a possible treatment for obesity, but was discontinued from further development after disappointing results in Phase II clinical trials. However it was still considered a successful proof of concept of the potential of Y5 receptor antagonists as possible anti-obesity agents in future.

References 

Neuropeptide Y antagonists
Tert-butyl compounds
Sulfonamides
Trifluoromethyl compounds
Carboxamides